Arif Heralić (5 May 1922 – 17 June 1971) was a Bosnian Roma metal worker on a blast furnace in Zenica. He had 11 children and issues with alcoholism and mental illness. As a disabled worker, Heralić died in extreme poverty in 1971.

Banknote and iconography

His picture was taken by Nikola Bibić, a Borba news photographer, in 1954 and from the papers he came to feature on a 1,000 Yugoslav dinar banknote issued from 1955 to 1981, re-nominated to ten new dinars since 1965. He is still (as of 2013) popular as an icon of industrial worker in the former Yugoslavia.

The banknote is not to be confused with the 20,000 dinar banknote, which depicts Alija Sirotanović.

See also
Alija Sirotanović, model for a 20,000 dinara banknote

References

1922 births
1971 deaths
People from Zenica
Bosnia and Herzegovina Romani people